Martha Jackson Jarvis (born 1952) is an American artist known for her mixed-media installations that explore aspects of African, African American, and Native American spirituality, ecological concerns, and the role of women in preserving indigenous cultures. Her installations are composed using a variety of natural materials including terracotta, sand, copper, recycled stone, glass, wood and coal. Her sculptures and installations are often site-specific, designed to interact with their surroundings and create a sense of place. Her works often focus on the history and culture of African Americans in the southern United States. In her exhibition at the Corcoran, Jarvis featured over 100 big collard green leaves, numerous carp and an live Potomac catfish.

Jackson Jarvis is best known for her outdoor public installations, including a mosaic, "River Spirits of the Anacostia", located at the Anacostia Metro station in Washington, DC, and sculptures, "Music of the Spheres, at Fannie Mae Plaza in Washington, DC, and "Crossroads/Trickster I," at the North Carolina Museum of Art in Raleigh. She also worked as a designer on the set of Julie Dash's 1991 film, Daughters of the Dust.

Julie McGee, an art historian at the University of Delaware stated, “The work of Jackson Jarvis operates in two worlds—that of large-scale public commissions and the more intimate space of the gallery. Very few artists are able to finesse both, and certainly not with her acumen and sensitivity.”

Jackson Jarvis is well-known for her work "Signs of the Times," which is a series of sculptures on a large scale that examine the history and culture of the African American community. Another significant work by the artist is the "Ancestors' Bones: Free Spirits" series, which consists of large-scale drawings that depict the relationship between nature and the human spirit through improvisational imprints of brush strokes and drips. This work serves as a meaningful tribute to the rich heritage of the community, and it has been displayed in numerous galleries and museums worldwide, such as the Smithsonian American Art Museum, the Corcoran Gallery of Art, and the National Museum of Women in the Arts.

Over the course of her career, Jackson Jarvis has been recognized with several awards and honors for her artistic contributions. Notably, she has been the recipient of a National Endowment for the Arts Fellowship, which is a prestigious accolade in the arts community. Additionally, she was inducted into the Washington, DC Hall of Fame, which is a notable recognition of her impact and influence in the region.

In addition to her artistic contributions , Jackson Jarvis has also been an enthusiastic educator and mentor. She has taught at esteemed institutions such as Howard University and the Maryland Institute College of Art. Her contributions to education and mentorship have earned her recognition, such as the Distinguished Alumni Award from the Cleveland Institute of Art.

Jackson Jarvis's artwork can be observed in several public places throughout Washington, D.C., including metro stations, courthouses, and the upcoming 11th Street Bridge Park. For instance, she produced the mosaic mural "River Spirits of the Anacostia" for the Anacostia metro station. Additionally, she and her daughter Njena Surae Jarvis were commissioned to create the "Anacostia's Sunrise/Sunset Portals" sculpture for the 11th Street Bridge Park, which is made of aluminum steel and glass mosaic and features 11 multi-colored arches that respond to the surroundings and replicate the color scheme of a sunrise or sunset.

The "Contemporary Visual Expressions" was an exhibition at the Smithsonian’s Anacostia Museum showcasing works by artists: Sam Gilliam, Martha Jackson Jarvis, Keith Morrison, and William T. Williams. The exhibit demonstrated the versatility of the new gallery and includes an installation created by artist and art historian David Driskell, who also served as guest curator for the show. The highlight of the exhibit was Jackson-Jarvis' "Path of the Avatar", a pinwheel structure that adds energy to the space.

Biography 

Martha Jackson Jarvis born in Lynchburg, Virginia in 1952, Martha Jackson Jarvis was exposed to the arts from an early age. During her early childhood in the 1950s and 1960s, Jackson Jarvis lived in Virginia, an experience she describes as "very segregated". She credits her interest in art to a childhood experience of accompanying her grandmother to a local spring to gather white clay and later making dolls and other objects with the material. The family moved to Philadelphia when she was thirteen.

Jackson Jarvis pursued a formal education in fine arts. She obtained a Bachelor of Fine Arts degree from Howard University in 1974 and later completed a Master of Fine Arts degree from the Maryland Institute College of Art in 1984. Her freshman year at Howard University in 1970 was very influential due to the active presence of artists including Lois Mailou Jones, Ed Love, Jeff Donaldson, and Elizabeth Catlett. She transferred to Temple University's Tyler School of Art in Philadelphia, to study ceramics. Jackson married Bernard Jarvis, the cousin of Bebe Moore Campbell. She continued her studio work while her children Njena and Bernard Jr. were young.

Exhibitions 

 1977 - African American Historical Museum, Philadelphia, Pennsylvania
 1979 - Brooks Memorial Museum – Memphis, TN
 1980 - Washington Project for the Arts (WPA), Washington, DC
 1980 - National Sculpture Conference – Baltimore, MD
 1981 - Howard University, Gallery of Art, Washington, DC
 1983 - Maryland Art Place – Baltimore, MD
 1983 - Franz Bader Gallery – Washington, DC
 1984 - California African American Museum – Los Angeles, CA
 1984 - Georgetown Court Artist Space – Washington, DC
 1985 - Nexus Foundation for Contemporary Art – Philadelphia, PA
 1985 - Dade County Public Library – Miami, FL
 1986 - Chicago Museum of Science and Industry – Chicago, IL
 1986 - The Everson Museum – Syracuse, NY
 1987 - Smithsonian Institution, Anacostia Museum – Washington, DC
 1988 - Maryland Art Institute, Myerhoff Gallery – Baltimore, MD
 1988 - University of Delaware Museum Gallery – Newark, DE
 1989 - BR Kornblatt Gallery – Washington, DC
 1989 - Washington Project for the Arts – Washington, DC
 1989 - California African American Museum – Los Angeles, CA
 1990 - New Jersey Center for Visual Arts – Summit, NJ
 1990 - SUNY College at Brockport Tower – Brockport, NY
 1990 - Southeastern Center for Contemporary Art (SECCA) – Winston-Salem, NC
 1990 - Museum of Contemporary Hispanic Art – New York, NY
 1991 - Tretyakov Gallery – Moscow
 1991 - BR Kornblatt Gallery – Washington, DC
 1991 - National Museum of Women in the Arts – Washington, DC
 1992 - The Fern Bank, Museum of Natural History – Atlanta, GA
 1992 - Peninsula Fine Arts Center – Newport News, VA
 1993 - Studio Museum of Harlem – New York, NY
 1993 - Philadelphia African American Historical Museum – Philadelphia, PA
 1994 - Art Museum of the Americas, Organization of American States – Washington, DC
 1994 - University of Maryland Art Gallery – College Park, MD
 1995 - Snug Harbor Cultural Center – Staten Island, NY
 1996 - Swarthmore College – Swarthmore, PA
 1996 - Maryland Art Place – Baltimore, MD
 1996 - Structuring Energy at the Corcoran Gallery, Washington, DC
 1996 - FSU Museum of Fine Arts – Tallahassee, FL
 1996 - African-American Museum – Dallas, TX
 1996 - Main Line Art Center – Haverford, PA
 1996 - Corcoran Gallery of Art – Washington, DC
 1997 - Spoleto Festival USA – Charleston, SC
 1999–2000 - Society for Contemporary Craft – Pittsburgh, PA
 2000 - Baley Museum – Richmond/Orange, VA
 2000 - South Carolina Botanical Garden Clemson, SC
 2000 - Addison-Ripley Fine Art – Washington, DC
 2007 - American University Museum – Washington, DC
 2007 - Manchester Craftsmen’s Guild – Pittsburgh, PA
 2008 - Bactria Art Center Dushanbe, Tajikistan
 2008 - Galerie Myrtis – Baltimore, MD
 2010 - The Kreeger Museum – Washington, DC
 2010 - University of Maryland University College – Adelphi, MD
 2010 - American University Museum – Washington, DC
 2011 - Gateway Art Center / Prince George’s African American Museum – Brentwood, MD
 2011 - Reginald F. Lewis Museum – Baltimore, MD
 2011 - Museum of the Americas, Organization of American States – Washington, DC
 2018 - Dumbarton Oaks Museum, Outside/IN, Washington, DC

Selected awards and honors 

 1986 - National Endowment for the Arts Fellowship in sculpture
 1977–1978 - Crafts Artist Grant
 1979–1980 - Individual Artist Grant in Sculpture, DC, Commission on the arts and humanities
 1982 - Emerging Artist Award, Washington DC, Mayor's art award
 1986 - Individual Artist Grant in Sculpture, DC, Commission on the arts
 1988 - Penny McCall Foundation Grant Award in Sculpture
 1992 - Virginia Groot Fellowship Grant in Sculpture
 1992 - Lila Wallace-Reader’s Digest Travel Grant to Italy, The American Academy in Rome
 1994 - Study Grant, Pilchuck Glass School
 2000 - Creative Capital Award in visual arts
 2007 - Artist in Residence, Lafayette College, Blackburn/Tague Experimental Printmaking Institute
 2011 - United States Artists Project
 2011 - Nominated for Anonymous Was a Woman Award
 Distinguished Alumni Award

Works 

 Gathering, 1988; University of Delaware
 Ochun: Earth Mounds, 1999-2000; South Carolina Botanical Garden, Clemson University
 Music of the Spheres, 2003; Van Ness Metro Station, Washington, DC
 Crossroads/Trickster I, 2005, Commissioned by the North Carolina Museum of Art
 Signs of the Times
 River Spirits of the Anacostia
 Anacostia's Sunrise/Sunset Portals
 Ancestors’ Bones: Free Spirits

Public Art Spaces (Public and Corporate Commissions) 

 United States Embassy (Freetown, Sierra Leone)
 New York Transit Authority (Metro NYC)
 Spoleto Festival USA (Charleston, SC)
 Arco Chemical Co. ( Newton, PA)
 Cleveland Public Art (OH)
 Phillip Morris Corp. (Washington, DC)
 North Carolina Museum of Art (Raleigh, NC)
 Johns Hopkins State Health Laboratory (Baltimore, MD)
 Merck Company (PA)
 Lenkin Company – (Washington, DC)
 KPMG Peat Marwick – (Washington, DC)
 Howery and Simon Law Firm – (Washington, DC)
 RST Development – (Silver Spring, MD)
 Arlington County – (Arlington, VA)
 New York Percent for Art – (Bronx, NY)
 Fannie Mae Corporation – (Washington, DC)
 Washington Metro Transit Authority – (Washington, DC)
 South Carolina Botanical Garden – (Clemson, SC)
 Prince George’s Co. Courthouse – (Upper Marlboro, MD)
 LaGuardia Community College – (Long Island, NY)

References

External links 

 
 Glover, Jeanette (2013). "Public Art by Martha Jackson Jarvis." YouTube [interview with the artist]
 
 
 
 
 
 Conversations with Artists: Martha Jackson Jarvis
 Artist Martha Jackson-Jarvis Describes Her “PurpleLine MD” Work
 Outside/IN: Martha Jackson Jarvis at Dumbarton Oaks
 Public Art by Martha Jackson-Jarvis
 Martha Jackson Jarvis - Material Girls: Contemporary Back Women Artists
 Martha Jackson Jarvis: Our Common Bond Artists Talk
 Martha Jackson Jarvis on "Scent of Magnolia I, II and III"
 The Artist at Work: Martha Jackson Jarvis
 Material Girls: Contemporary Black Women Artists (Media Preview)

1952 births
Living people
20th-century American women artists
People from Lynchburg, Virginia
Artists from Philadelphia
Artists from Washington, D.C.
Howard University alumni
Temple University Tyler School of Art alumni
Antioch University alumni
21st-century American women